{|

{{Infobox ship career
|Hide header=
|Ship country=
|Ship flag=
|Ship type=Cargo ship
|Ship name=*Empire Beaconsfield (1943-46)
Hawkinge (1946-51)
Angusbrae (1951-56)
Hispania (1956-60)Dia (1960-64)
|Ship owner=*Ministry of War Transport (1943-46
Constants (South Wales) Ltd (1946-51)
Dundee, Perth & London Shipping Co (1951-56)
Willem H Müller & Co NV (1956-60)
West End Corporation (1960-64)
|Ship operator=*Andrew Weir & Co Ltd (Bank Line) (1943)
Constants (South Wales) Ltd (1943-51)
Dundee, Perth & London Shipping Co (1951-56)
Willem H Müller & Co NV (1956-60)
West End Corporation (1960-64)
|Ship ordered=
|Ship awarded=
|Ship builder=William Gray & Co Ltd, West Hartlepool
|Ship yard no=1159
|Ship laid down=
|Ship launched=2 October 1943
|Ship completed=November 1943
|Ship christened=
|Ship acquired=
|Ship registry=* West Hartlepool (1943-51)
 UK (1951-60)
 Rotterdam (1956-60)
 Panama City (1960-64)
|Ship identification=*UK Official Number 180066 (Empire Beaconsfield)
Code Letters GFMX (Empire Beaconsfield)

|Ship commissioned=
|Ship recommissioned=
|Ship decommissioned=
|Ship in service=
|Ship out of service=
|Ship renamed=
|Ship reclassified=
|Ship refit=
|Ship captured=
|Ship struck=
|Ship reinstated=
|Ship fate= Sank, 14 October 1964
}}

|}

SS Dia was a  cargo ship which was built as Empire Beaconsfield in 1943. She was owned by the Ministry of War Transport (MoWT) and managed by Bank Line Ltd and Constants (South Wales) LTd. Postwar she was sold to her managers and renamed  Hawkinge. She later saw service with different owners as Angusbrae, Hispania and Dia. She developed a leak and sank off Savona, Italy on 14 October 1964.

CareerEmpire Beaconsfield was built by William Gray & Sons Ltd, West Hartlepool, Co Durham. She was yard number 1159, Empire Beaconsfield was launched on 2 October 1943 and completed in December that year. Empire Beaconsfield was built for the MoWT and placed under the management of Andrew Weir & Co Ltd, trading as the Bank Line. Her port of registry was West Hartlepool.

In 1943, management was transferred from Bank Line to Constants (South Wales) Ltd, Cardiff. In 1946, she was sold to her managers and renamed Hawkinge. In 1951, she was sold to the Dundee, Perth & London Shipping Co and renamed Angusbrae. In 1956, she was sold to Willem H Müller & Co NV, Rotterdam and renamed Hispania. In 1960, she was sold to the West End Corporation, Panama and renamed Dia.

Sinking

Official Numbers and Code Letters

Official Numbers were a forerunner to IMO Numbers. Empire Beaconsfield'' had the UK Official Number 180066 and used the Code Letters GFMX.

Propulsion

It was built by the Central Marine Engineering Works Ltd, West Hartlepool and developed .

References

External links
Photos of SS Hispania

1943 ships
Ships built on the River Tees
Empire ships
Ministry of War Transport ships
Steamships of the United Kingdom
Merchant ships of the United Kingdom
Steamships of the Netherlands
Merchant ships of the Netherlands
Steamships of Panama
Merchant ships of Panama
Shipwrecks in the Mediterranean Sea
Maritime incidents in 1964